Chandeshwori Jatra (चण्डेश्वरी जात्रा) is considered the largest festival in Kavrepalanchowk district, Nepal. It is celebrated for three days. It is the festival of Hindu goddess Chandeshwori or Parvati.

This festival is celebrated in the honor of the victory over the demon Chandasur on the first full moon day of the New Year's festival in the country.

See also
 List of Hindu festivals

References

External links
 

Festivals in Nepal
Kavrepalanchok District